Derek Cecil (born January 5, 1973) is an American actor. He played the role of Seth Grayson on the Netflix series House of Cards, starred in the short-lived series Push, Nevada and The Beat, and made several appearances in the series Pasadena and Banshee.

He is also in the Showtime series Black Monday as Detective Lester.

Early life
Cecil was born in Amarillo, Texas. He graduated from the University of Houston and the American Conservatory Theater. He graduated from William H. Taft High School in San Antonio, Texas.

Filmography

Film

Television

References

External links

1973 births
Living people
Male actors from Texas
American male film actors
American male television actors
People from Amarillo, Texas
University of Houston alumni
20th-century American male actors
21st-century American male actors